Zsolt Azari (born 30 August 1986 in Dunaújváros, Hungary) is a professional Hungarian ice hockey player. He is currently playing and has played most of his professional career with him hometown team, Dunaújvárosi Acélbikák, in the MOL Liga.

Personal
A product of the local youth system, Azari plays for his hometown club since the age of 6. He made his senior debut in 2002.

In the same year he made five appearances for the Hungarian U18 national team on the U18 World Championships, collecting a total of 5 points. Next year he was selected both for the U18 and U20 World Cup. He later represented his country on further two U20 World Cups, having won the gold medal on the 2005 World Junior Ice Hockey Championships.

Spent a short spell at Slovakian second-tier team HK Ruzinov 99 Bratislava in the 2005-06 season, playing mostly in the junior team.

From 2006 until 2015, he was a regular first team player of the Acélbikák. He transferred to Ciarko PBS Bank STS Sanok in Poland in November 2015. He returned to his hometown team at the end of the 2015-16 season.

Career statistics

Regular season and playoffs

International statistics

External links
 Zsolt Azari Profile on Dunaújvárosi Acélbikák Official Website

References
 Profile and statistics on Eliteprospects.com

1986 births
Living people
Sportspeople from Dunaújváros
Hungarian ice hockey forwards